Cyndie Allemann (born 4 April 1986 in Moutier) is a Swiss racing driver.

She is the daughter of former Swiss karting champion Kurt Allemann and the sister of fellow racing driver Ken Allemann. After beginning her career in karting, she moved to cars in 2004 in Renault Speed Trophy F2000 and finished 6th. The next year she moved to the more highly regarded German championship for the same cars and finished 12th. In 2006, she moved up to the Formel 3 Cup, finishing in 9th place and winning the pole position at EuroSpeedway Lausitz. The following year she drove in the Formula 3 Euro Series for British team Manor Motorsport racing a Dallara-Mercedes, but despite participating in all 20 races, failed to score points and was not classified in the season standings.

In 2008, Allemann signed to race in Firestone Indy Lights series for American Spirit Racing. She would go on to finish 14th in the final points standings with her best result being a 4th place in the second race at the Mid-Ohio Sports Course in July.

For the 2010 season she teamed up with Natacha Gachnang and raced for the Swiss Matech team in a GT1 class Ford GT. Primarily racing in the FIA GT1 World Championship she also raced in the 2010 24 Hours of Le Mans.

She drove for Hitotsuyama Racing using Audi R8 LMS in the 2012 Super GT season, in which she became the first female driver in Super GT series history (and third since 1997 including JGTC).

Racing record

Career summary

Complete Formula 3 Euro Series results
(key) (Races in bold indicate pole position) (Races in italics indicate fastest lap)

American open–wheel results
(key)

Indy Lights

Complete GT1 World Championship results

24 Hours of Le Mans results

Complete Super GT results

References

External links

At.ford.com

1986 births
Living people
Swiss racing drivers
24 Hours of Le Mans drivers
Swiss female racing drivers
Formula 3 Euro Series drivers
Formula Renault Eurocup drivers
German Formula Renault 2.0 drivers
Formula Renault 2.0 Alps drivers
Indy Lights drivers
FIA GT1 World Championship drivers
Super GT drivers
ADAC GT Masters drivers
Manor Motorsport drivers
Jenzer Motorsport drivers
Karting World Championship drivers
PDM Racing drivers
24H Series drivers